The Years of Lead ( Sanawāt ar-Ruṣāṣ) was a period of the rule of King Hassan II of Morocco, from roughly the 1960s through the 1980s, marked by state violence and repression against political dissidents and democracy activists. The coups and protests aimed at overthrowing the authoritarian monarchy the Alaouite dynasty in Morocco and forming a democratic republic that represents the Moroccan people instead.

Timeframe

Hassan II was king from 1961 until his death in 1999. His reign was marked by political unrest and a heavy-handed government response to criticism and opposition. Political repression increased dramatically upon Hassan's ascent to the throne of the country in 1961, and this repressive political climate would last for nearly three decades.

Due to strong popular mobilization from the Moroccan democracy and human rights activists and pressure from the general Moroccan population, as well as pressure from the wider international human rights community.

Repression and its victims

Political oppression plateaued in the 1960s and wound down only in the early 1990s. During the Years of Lead, dissidents were arrested, executed, tortured, imprisoned or "disappeared", newspapers were closed and books were banned. There are few reliable lists of victims for the time, but there were hundreds of political killings and forced disappearances. Arbitrary arrests and torture affected many, including some of those outside the usual opposition networks. The reports about these human rights issues sparked domestic and international criticism. By the early 1990s, international condemnation of Morocco's poor human rights record became so strong, that Hassan II had no choice but to liberate the country at least somewhat, in order to avoid international isolation and tension with other countries, so that Morocco would avoid becoming a pariah state. As a result, Morocco gradually became more democratic and free over time.

Some examples of government repression during this period included:

 Targeting of dissidents: Opposition politics was a life-threatening activity in Morocco during the low points of the Years of Lead. Harassment of dissidents was commonplace and several outspoken anti-government activists were jailed and tortured or forcibly disappeared by government forces or died mysteriously. Mehdi Ben Barka, founder of the National Union of Popular Forces (UNFP) and leader of the Tricontinental Conference, which was supposed to unite anti-colonialist movements throughout the world independently of Moscow and Washington, "disappeared" in Paris in 1965. This led to the resignation of the prefect of Paris, Maurice Papon. Abraham Serfaty, for his part, was imprisoned for 17 years and then exiled by Hassan II upon his liberation in September 1991.
 Crackdowns on protesters: Hundreds were killed and thousands arrested in connection with demonstrations and politicized labor strikes against the government. Casualties among demonstrators occurred in the 1981 Moroccan riots and in Fes in 1990.
 Purges of the army: After the attempted military coups against the king in 1971 and 1972, officers and other involved putschists were rounded up and sent to secret detention camps such as Tazmamart, where many died. Mohamed Oufkir, Hassan II's right-hand man in the 1960s, convicted in France for the assassination of Mehdi Ben Barka, was himself executed in 1972 after a failed coup attempt. Oufkir's children were imprisoned in retaliation. His daughter, Malika Oufkir, wrote a book title Stolen Lives: Twenty Years in a Desert Jail, recounting the experience.
 Rif Wars: in 1958–1959, the Moroccan army fought rebellious Berber tribes in the Rif mountains that resented the Alaouite Dynasty's rule. The uprisings were harshly put down with thousands of casualties. Including these events as forming part of the "Years of Lead" would greatly increase the figures concerning victims.

ERC: Looking into the past 
As the more liberal-minded Mohammed VI succeeded his father on the throne in 1999, the period was definitely over. While Morocco is still not considered a democracy in the western meaning of the term and human rights abuses still frequently occur according to rights groups (especially against suspected Islamists and Sahrawi independence seekers), important reforms have been instituted to examine past abuses. The press is considerably freer than before and debate on many subjects is intense, although the monarchy, political Islam and Western Sahara remain more or less untouchable. Parliament still holds no power over the King, but elections are semi-fair, whereas they were blatantly rigged or suspended for many years during the 1970s and 1980s. Several independent human rights organizations have formed to investigate the impact of state repression during the years of rule and to press claims for damages suffered.

One of the most significant developments was the setting up of the Equity and Reconciliation Commission (ERC, French acronym IER) in January 2004. The ERC is an official government human rights committee authorized to examine human rights abuses committed by the government and administer compensations for victims of unfair policies. While this is almost unprecedented in the Arab world, the ERC's actual independence from the current administration and its ability to reach culprits in the Moroccan elite, known as the "makhzen", has been seriously disputed. The ERC is not mandated to identify or prosecute discovered human rights offenders and there has been no trials against government employees for their actions during the Years of Lead. The situation in Western Sahara, a territory annexed and occupied by Morocco after the Madrid Accords in the 1970s, has been mentioned by rights groups as especially serious. There are complaints that the ERC either cannot or will not examine the cases of disappeared or killed Sahrawis with the same forcefulness as with Moroccans.

On January 6, 2006, King Mohammed VI expressed regret for the human rights abuses that had occurred during his father's reign and spoke of the need for lessons to be drawn from the past.

The commission's work, and the emotional legacy of the Years of Lead on four families, is also explored in the 2008 documentary film Our Forbidden Places (Nos lieux interdits).

See also
 Human rights in Morocco
 Sand War
 1965 Moroccan riots
 Mehdi Ben Barka
 1971 Moroccan coup d'état attempt
 1972 Moroccan coup d'état attempt
 Green March and Western Sahara War 
 1981 Moroccan riots
 Politics of Morocco
 History of Morocco

References

Further reading
 Malika Oufkir and Michelle Fitoussi (2001), Stolen Lives: Twenty Years in a Desert Jail, Miramax Books
 Ali Bourequat (1998), In the Moroccan King's Secret Gardens, Maurice Publishers
 Christine Daure-Serfaty (2002), Tazmamart,
 Ahmed Marzouki (2000), Tazmamart Cellule 10 (Tazmamart Cell 10), Editions Paris Méditerranée; Casablanca: Tarik Editions
 Interview with Mr. Marzouki:  
 Tahar Ben Jelloun (2000), This Blinding Absence of Light (Cette aveuglante absence de lumière), Editions du Seuil and New Press,
 Summaries of the book: &  
Sonja Hegasy, Bettina Dennerlein. "Die Marokkanische Wahrheitskommission zwischen Politik und Geschichte. " In: Christoph Marx (ed.), Bilder nach dem Sturm. Wahrheitskommissionen und historische Identitätsstiftung zwischen Staat und Zivilgesellschaft, Berlin: Lit Verlag..

External links
 Morocco Finds Graves of 50 killed in 70's - New York Times
 1981 martyrs' mass grave found in Casablanca - Moroccan Times
 Morocco's Truth Commission: Honoring Past Victims during an Uncertain Present - Human Rights Watch
 Royal Gulag - The Economist

20th century in Morocco
History of Western Sahara
Political and cultural purges
Political repression
Human rights abuses in Morocco
Torture in Morocco
Dirty wars
Cold War conflicts